Persinger House is a historic home located at Covington, Alleghany County, Virginia. The original section was built about 1757, and enlarged in 1888.  It is a two-story, six bay, single-pile log and frame house with weatherboard siding and a gable roof. A 20th century kitchen is connected to the house by a hyphen.  It features a two-story, porch supported by chamfered posts, simple cut-out friezes, and a Chinese lattice railing.  Also on the property is a contributing late-19th century barn.

It was added to the National Register of Historic Places in 1982.

References

Houses on the National Register of Historic Places in Virginia
Houses completed in 1888
Houses in Alleghany County, Virginia
National Register of Historic Places in Alleghany County, Virginia